Cupidon may refer to:

 Cupid (known as Cupidon in French), a god of classical mythology
 Cupidon (comics), a Belgian comics series by Malik and Raoul Cauvin
 Cupidon (1875), a painting by William-Adolphe Bouguereau
 Georgie Cupidon (born 1981), male badminton player from Seychelles
 Cupidon Mouse, a children's television programme which is produced and broadcast by the BBC.

See also
 Cupid (disambiguation)
 Cupido (disambiguation)

de:Cupido
nl:Cupido
no:Cupido
ru:Купидон (значения)